JTR may refer to:

JTR (band), a Swedish boy band
JTR (song), by Dave Matthews Band
Joe Tandy Racing, a Formula Three team
Santorini (Thira) National Airport's IATA code in Greece